Stoneground Words is an album released by Melanie in 1972. It contains the singles "Together Alone" and "Do You Believe".

Reception

Allmusic.com praises the album as "mature, intelligent and ambitious" and an "under-heard classic".

U.K. music bible Melody Maker hailed the album as "the most sophisticated she's made. The naiveté of "Beautiful People" and the streaks of self-pity have been replaced by deeper, more comprehensive methods of expression."

NME conceded that "this album is... well, it's kind of nice, you know? A trifle over-arranged, and more than a little corny, but very soothing. All in all, possibly the most enjoyable Melanie I've heard, far more mature and purged of many of the more cloying qualities of her earlier stuff."

Track listing
All songs written by Melanie Safka except where noted.
"Together Alone"
"Between the Road Signs"
"Summer Weaving"
"My Rainbow Race" (Pete Seeger)
"Do You Believe?"
"I Am Not a Poet (Night Song)"
"Stoneground Words"
"Song of the South, Based on a Theme from Song of the North, Adapted from the Original"
"Maybe I Was (A Golf Ball)"
"Here I Am"

Personnel
Melanie - guitar, vocals
Sal DiTroia - acoustic guitar
Hugh McCracken - guitar
Bill Keith - steel guitar
Don Payne - Fender bass
Chuck Domanico, Richard Davis - double bass
Roger Kellaway - piano, arrangements
Ron Frangipane - organ, harmonium 
Donald McDonald - drums
Johnny Pacheco - congas
Al Cohn - tenor saxophone
Technical
Brooks Arthur - engineer
Tom Wilkes - photography

Charts

References 

1972 albums
Melanie (singer) albums